Gérard Albouy (1912–1985), often known by the name Ouy, was a French milliner. Between 1938 and 1964, he operated a Parisian hat shop called Albouy that was known for its decorative, baroque-style hats. Notable works include veiled hats made of recycled newspaper, which he constructed during the German occupation of France, and the mollusque, a hat made without interlining. Albouy's hobbies included painting and collecting art.

References 

French milliners
French designers
1912 births
1985 deaths